Lucius Gellius Poplicola or Publicola ( 43–31 BC) was a Roman senator who led a checkered political career during the civil wars of the late Republic. Initially a supporter of Julius Caesar's assassins, Brutus and Cassius, he defected to the Second Triumvirate and was later rewarded with a consulship, in 36 BC. Gellius fought for Mark Antony against Octavian at the Battle of Actium in 31 BC, after which he disappears from history.

Biography
Lucius Gellius is apparently mentioned in a letter by Lucius Munatius Plancus to Cicero, where he is praised as a good republican who had intermediated between Plancus and Lepidus. After the republican party collapsed in Italy following the war of Mutina, Gellius fled east to join Julius Caesar's assassins, Brutus and Cassius. Here he was detected plotting to take the life of Brutus but was pardoned at the intercession of his brother, Marcus Valerius Messalla Corvinus. Shortly afterwards he entered into a conspiracy to kill Cassius, but again escaped unpunished through the intercession of his mother Palla.

Gellius, however, showed no gratitude for the leniency which had been shown him. Rather, he change sides and joined the triumvirs, Octavian and Mark Antony. While serving under Antony in the east c. 41 BC he had coins struck, on which he appears with the title of Q. P., probably Quaestor Propraetore. He was rewarded for his treachery with the consulship in 36 BC. In the war between Octavian and Antony, he supported Antony, and commanded the right wing of Antony's fleet at the Battle of Actium. As he is not mentioned again in any known historical texts, it can be assumed that he most likely perished in the battle or in the war.

Family
Lucius Gellius Poplicola is identified in the sources as a brother of Marcus Valerius Messalla Corvinus, and their mother was called Palla. Münzer and Evans supposed that they were half-brothers, and identified Gellius Poplicola's father as Lucius Gellius, consul in 72 BC. Badian preferred to see them as full brothers, sons of a Valerius Messalla who, in keeping with a trend of the time, gave distinguished ancestral surnames (Poplicola and Corvinus) of the Valerii to both his sons. Gellius Poplicola will then have been adopted by Lucius Gellius, consul of 72 BC, explaining his distinct name.

Gellius Poplicola married one Sempronia, sister of Lucius Atratinus.

Endnotes

References

 
 
 
 
 
 

1st-century BC births
31 BC deaths
1st-century BC Roman consuls
Ancient Roman adoptees
Ancient Romans killed in action
Poplicola, Lucius
Recipients of ancient Roman pardons
Valerii Messallae
Year of birth unknown